HMS Sandringham was one of 93 ships of the  of inshore minesweepers.

Their names were all chosen from villages ending in -ham. The minesweeper was named after Sandringham in Norfolk.

She was laid up in reserve at Rosneath and converted to serve as a ferry (1972–83) for RNAD Coulport workers. She was sold to Pounds in 1986 and became the Greek ferry Sotirakis II.

References
Blackman, R.V.B. ed. Jane's Fighting Ships (1953)

 

Ham-class minesweepers
1957 ships
Ships built on the River Clyde
1957 in Scotland
History of Renfrewshire
Economy of Renfrewshire